Snag may refer to:

Places
 Snag, Yukon

Other uses
 Snag (ecology), a standing dead tree or a tree, or a branch of a tree, fixed in the bottom of navigable water, that may be a hazard to navigation
Snag forest, a recovery stage of natural forest
 Snag (textiles), a fiber pulled from in normal pattern in a fabric
 Snag (website), an online staffing platform specializing in hourly work
 SnaG, the Seachtain na Gaeilge celebrations
 Snag, a sausage in Australian English
 Snag list, or punch list, prepared near the end of a construction project listing work not conforming to contract specifications that the contractor must complete 
 Snagging, snag fishing
 Snagging, another word for shredding trees